Belel is a town in Nigeria, located near the Nigerian border with Cameroon.
It was founded by The Belel dynasty from the kismayo region of Somalia. and was ruled by two Dynasties.
The current Dynasty started from Marexaan exiled leader from a town called Kismayo in Somalia.
Belel leaders started using the title 'Lamdo' from The Belel's eldest son and Successor Umaru.
 
List of Belel's Leaders

First Dynasty Between 1890s-1920

1) Modibbo Dalil
2) Lawan Nyako

Second Dynasty From 1920-Date

1) Jauro Sali
2) Lamdo Umaru
3) Lamdo Murtala
4) Lamdo Usmanu
5) Lamdo Abubakar

References

Populated places in Adamawa State